Horkstow Camera was a monastic cell in Lincolnshire, England, dependent on Willoughton Preceptory, a house of the Knights Templar.

Lincolnshire preceptories
Until their disbandment in 1312, the Knights Templar were major landowners on the higher lands of Lincolnshire, where they had a number of preceptories on property which provided income, while Temple Bruer was an estate on the Lincoln Heath, believed to have been used also for military training. The preceptories from which the Lincolnshire properties were managed were:
Aslackby Preceptory, Kesteven
Bottesford, Lindsey
Eagle, Kesteven
Great Limber, Lindsey
Horkstow, Lindsey
Witham Preceptory, Kesteven
Temple Bruer, Kesteven
Willoughton Preceptory, Lindsey
Byard's Leap was part of the Temple Bruer estate.

References

Monasteries in Lincolnshire